Witnesses is a Croatian drama film directed by Vinko Brešan. It was released in 2003.

Synopsis
The plot of the movie is centered in the city of Karlovac in 1992, during the Croatian War of Independence. The front lines, where Croatian and Serbian forces fight each other, lie near the city. Meanwhile, in the city of Karlovac, a Serbian civilian Vasić is murdered. The story follows the local police officer Barbir (Dražen Kühn), who tries to solve the murder in spite of ethnic hatred and war revolving nearby.

The film's screenplay is based on Jurica Pavičić's 1997 novel Alabaster Sheep (Ovce od gipsa), which was in turn inspired by a real-life case of murder of the Zec family in Zagreb in 1991.

Cast
 Leon Lučev as Krešo
 Alma Prica as Novinarka
 Mirjana Karanović as Majka
 Dražen Kühn as Barbir
 Krešimir Mikić as Joško
 Marinko Prga as Vojo
 Bojan Navojec as Barić
 Ljubomir Kerekeš as Dr. Matić
 Predrag 'Predjo' Vušović as Ljubo
 Tarik Filipović as Javni tužitelj
 Rene Bitorajac as Albanac
 Ivo Gregurević as Otac
 Vanja Drach as Penzioner
 Helena Buljan as Susjeda

References

External links
 

2003 films
2000s Croatian-language films
2003 drama films
Films based on Croatian novels
Yugoslav Wars films
Works about the Croatian War of Independence
Croatian drama films